"When I Get Thru with You (You'll Love Me Too)" is a song written by Harlan Howard which became a hit for Patsy Cline in 1962. The song went to #10 on the country chart and #53 on the pop chart. Howard had previously co-written Cline's #1 hit "I Fall to Pieces".

Cline sings about how she desperately wants a man that she really likes, the only problem is he has a girlfriend already. So what she decides to do is try to get through with him and in the end she says, "when I get through with you, you'll love me true, not Sue".

French singer Françoise Hardy covered the song in 1965 as "Quel mal y a-t-il à ça?"

Chart performance

References

1962 singles
Patsy Cline songs
Songs written by Harlan Howard
1962 songs
Decca Records singles
Song recordings produced by Owen Bradley